Richard Johnson (born 2 February 1972) is a Welsh professional golfer.

Johnson led the Nationwide Tour money list in 2007 to get his PGA Tour card for the 2008 season, but was unable to retain his card. He played on the Nationwide Tour from 1999 to 2004, 2006 to 2007, and 2009 to 2010.

At the 2009 Michael Hill New Zealand Open on the Nationwide Tour, Johnson scored a hole in one on the par-4 15th hole for which he won a pallet of Heineken beer. He was only the second Nationwide Tour golfer to score a hole-in-one on a par-4 (Chip Beck was the first in 2001).

His father Peter Johnson is the former pro at Vale of Glamorgan in Cardiff, Wales and is chairman of the PGA in Wales. Peter Johnson is now the professional at Ridgeway Golf Club in Caerphilly.

Professional wins (5)

Nationwide Tour wins (4)

Nationwide Tour playoff record (1–0)

PGA EuroPro Tour wins (1)

Results in The Players Championship

CUT = missed the halfway cut

Team appearances
Amateur
Jacques Léglise Trophy (representing Great Britain & Ireland): 1988 (winners), 1989 (winners)
European Amateur Team Championship (representing Wales): 1991, 1993 (winners)
St Andrews Trophy (representing Great Britain & Ireland): 1994 (winners)

Professional
World Cup (representing Wales): 2008

See also
2007 Nationwide Tour graduates
List of golfers with most Web.com Tour wins

References

External links

Welsh male golfers
Augusta Jaguars men's golfers
PGA Tour golfers
Korn Ferry Tour graduates
Sportspeople from Cardiff
Sportspeople from Fort Smith, Arkansas
1972 births
Living people